The Roman Catholic Diocese of Kolda is a diocese located in the city of Kolda in the Ecclesiastical province of Dakar in Senegal.

History
 December 22, 1999: Established as Diocese of Kolda from Diocese of Ziguinchor

Special churches
 The cathedral is Cathédrale Notre Dame des Victoires in Kolda.

Leadership
 Bishops of Kolda (Roman rite)
 Bishop Jean-Pierre Bassène (since December 22, 1999)

See also
Roman Catholicism in Senegal

References

External links
 GCatholic.org
 Catholic Hierarchy 

Roman Catholic dioceses in Senegal
Christian organizations established in 1999
Roman Catholic dioceses and prelatures established in the 20th century
1999 establishments in Senegal
Roman Catholic Ecclesiastical Province of Dakar